Mitsuharu Kitamura (2 October 1934 – 2006) was a Japanese wrestler. He competed in the men's Greco-Roman lightweight at the 1960 Summer Olympics.

References

1934 births
2006 deaths
Japanese male sport wrestlers
Olympic wrestlers of Japan
Wrestlers at the 1960 Summer Olympics
Sportspeople from Hokkaido